Christman is a surname. Notable people with the surname include:

Allen Bert Christman, American cartoonist
Karen Christman, American bioengineer 
Daniel W. Christman, American general
Mark Christman, American baseball player
Otto Christman, Canadian soccer player
Paul Christman, American football player
Tim Christman, American baseball player
Tory Christman, Scientology critic
William Henry Christman, American soldier

See also
Adam Cristman (born 1985), American soccer player
Franklin W. Cristman (1869–1942), New York politician
Chrisman (surname)